Muriel Edith Nichol JP (born 2 Feb 1893 Wilmslow, Cheshire - died 28 May 1983 Welwyn Garden City, Hertfordshire), née Wallhead, was a Labour Party politician in England.

Early life 
The daughter of Richard Wallhead (Independent Labour Party chairman 1920–1922 and MP for Merthyr 1922–1934) was married with one son, and worked as a teacher before entering parliament.  She served as Chair of Welwyn Garden City Urban District Council from 1937 to 1945.

Political career 
At the 1935 general election, she stood unsuccessfully in the Bradford North constituency in West Yorkshire, losing by a wide margin to the sitting Conservative Party Member of Parliament (MP) Eugene Ramsden.  In the Labour landslide at the 1945 general election, she unseated Ramsden, winning the seat with a majority of 3,444 (a swing of 12.7%).

After boundary changes for the 1950 general election, she lost her seat to the Conservative and National Liberal Party candidate, William Taylor. She was unsuccessful in seeking to return to Parliament for Stockport North in the 1955 general election.

References

 UK General Elections since 1832
 
 Muriel Nichol at the Centre for Advancement of Women in Politics

External links 
 

1893 births
1983 deaths
British schoolteachers
Labour Party (UK) MPs for English constituencies
Female members of the Parliament of the United Kingdom for English constituencies
UK MPs 1945–1950
Politics of Bradford
20th-century British women politicians
20th-century English women
20th-century English people